Ceriagrion auranticum is a species of damselfly in the family Coenagrionidae. it is commonly known as orange-tailed sprite. This species can be found in south and southeast Asia.

Fraser described this species in 1922. Hämäläinen (1987) considered Ceriagrion latericium Lieftinck, 1951, described from Sumatra, as a junior synonym of C. auranticum. 

It breeds in slow running streams, ponds, and swamps.

See also 
 List of odonates of India
 List of odonata of Kerala

References 

Coenagrionidae
Insects described in 1922
Taxa named by Frederic Charles Fraser